Barry Moser (born 1940) is an American artist and educator, known as a printmaker specializing in wood engravings, and an illustrator of numerous works of literature. He is also the owner and operator of the Pennyroyal Press, an engraving and small book publisher founded in 1970.

Early life and education
Moser was born in 1940 in Chattanooga, Tennessee. Moser studied at the Baylor School, Auburn University, and the University of Tennessee at Chattanooga, and did graduate work at the University of Massachusetts Amherst. He studied printmaking with Leonard Baskin.

Career 
Moser is known for his illustrations for Lewis Carroll's Alice's Adventures in Wonderland and Through the Looking-Glass, each of which consisted of more than a hundred prints, and the former of which won him the National Book Award for design and illustration in 1983. He has illustrated nearly 300 other works as well, including portions of the Time Life book series The Enchanted World, A River Runs Through It, and Moby-Dick. He published his own illustrated Bible edition, and he illustrated the Allen Mandelbaum translation of Dante's Inferno, published in 1980 as Inferno: First Book of the Divine Comedy.

He has been on the faculty of the Department of Illustration Studies at the Rhode Island School of Design, for many years he was on the faculty of the Williston Northampton School and has been a Professor in Residence and Printer to the College at Smith College. Barry Moser also teaches Life Drawing at the Glen East Workshop, held in summers at Pioneer Valley, Massachusetts.

His works have been displayed in such places as the British Museum, the Metropolitan Museum, Harvard University, and the Library of Congress.

In 2007 the Smithsonian Art Collectors Program commissioned Moser to create a print for their Small Treasures series, the sales of which benefit educational and cultural programs through the Smithsonian Associates. The resulting relief engraving, An Old Chestnut is on display in the S. Dillon Ripley Center in the National Mall.

Bibliography

Art books

Children's books 

 And Still the Turtle Watched (1991)
 Polly Vaughn: A Traditional British Ballad (1992)
 Speak!: Children's Book Illustrators Brag about their Dogs (1993)
 The Farm Summer 1942 (1994)
 I Am the Dog, I Am the Cat (1994)

 The Pageant (1995)
 Our New Puppy (1996)

 
A Ring of Tricksters: Animal Tales from America, the West Indies, and Africa (1997)
 Dippers (1997)
 Great Ghost Stories (1998)
 Dogs of Myth: Tales from Around the World (1999)
 Earthquack! (2002)
 That Summer (2002)
 Voices of Ancient Egypt (2003)
 Hummingbird Nest: A Journal of Poems (2004)
 Wee Winnie Witch's Skinny: An Original African American Scare Tale (2004)
 The Three Silly Billies (2005)
 A Horse Named Funny Cide (2006)
 Literary Genius: 25 Classic Writers Who Define English & American Literature (2007)
 Jack London's Dog (2008)
 Hogwood Steps Out: A Good, Good Pig Story (2008)
 Lousy Rotten Stinkin' Grapes (2009)
 The Cheshire Cheese Cat: A Dickens of a Tale (2011)
 Oh, Harry! (2011)
 Franklin and Winston: A Christmas That Changed the World (2011)
 Cat Talk (2013)
 We Were Brothers (2015)

Novels, fairy tales 

 Frankenstein (1984)
 The Adventures of Tom Sawyer (1989)
 A River Runs Through It (1989)
 Beauty and the Beast (1992)
 The Adventures of Sherlock Holmes (1992)
 First Love: A Gothic Tale (1996)

References

Further reading 
 Simon Brett, 'Abigail Rorer & Barry Moser', in Parenthesis; 21 (Autumn 2011), pg 15-17
 Moser, Barry,  Wood Engraving: the Art of Wood Engraving & Relief Engraving (2006)

External links
 Barry Moser and his own Pennyroyal Press
Barry Moser etchings, engravings, and papers, Special Collections and University Archives, University of Tennessee at Chattanooga
The Papers of Barry Moser at Dartmouth College Library
Pennyroyal Press records at the Mortimer Rare Book Collection, Smith College Special Collections
 

American illustrators
American printmakers 
Rhode Island School of Design faculty
Auburn University alumni
University of Tennessee at Chattanooga alumni
University of Massachusetts Amherst alumni
1940 births
Living people
Smith College faculty
American wood engravers